Greenhill is an unincorporated community in Lauderdale County, Alabama. It is often mispronounced incorrectly as “Green Hill.” 

Greenhill is the hometown of Iron Horse Bluegrass, Secret Sisters, and Jason Isbell, a singer-songwriter and former member of the Drive-By Truckers.

Notes

Unincorporated communities in Lauderdale County, Alabama
Unincorporated communities in Alabama